Tom Jozef Irène Van Grieken (born 7 October 1986) is a Belgian politician and author who has served as leader of Vlaams Belang since October 2014.

Early life 
Van Grieken was born in Antwerp and later moved to Mortsel where he served as a municipal councillor. His father is a retired police officer and his mother worked at a tobacconist store. He studied communications management at the Plantijn Hogeschool and worked in the advertising sector prior to entering politics full time.

Political career

National politics 
As a pupil and a student, Van Grieken was active in the NJSV and the NSV, eventually becoming national president of the NSV. Van Grieken became a member of Vlaams Blok in 2003 as a teenager and subsequently joined its successor Vlaams Belang. After his studies, Van Grieken was elected national president of the Vlaams Belang Jongeren, the youth wing of Vlaams Belang. In September 2014, he was nominated by the party's council to become the party's new leader. At the party's congress in October he ran unopposed and obtained 93% of the votes, becoming Belgium's youngest party leader ever.

Although initially known as a hardliner within the party, he has since attempted to moderate the VB's image as leader in order to break the cordon sanitaire imposed on the party, stating "There is no cordon sanitaire around our ideas, but there is about our style."

He has been a member of the municipal council of Mortsel from 2007 until 2018 and was elected in the Flemish Parliament in 2014. He was elected as a member of the municipal council of Schoten, where he now still lives, in 2018.

Under his leadership the VB has seen a massive increase in public support, including finishing in second place in the Flemish region during the 2019 federal elections in which Van Grieken was elected to the Chamber of Representatives. Following the election, he became the first leader of the VB to attend a meeting with King Philippe along with the other main party leaders.

In November 2019, he was reelected as party leader and obtained 97,4% of the votes.

The Vlaams Belang party has remained relatively popular under his leadership. In a poll published in December 2019, Vlaams Belang polled at 27,3 percent, making it the biggest party in Flanders and Belgium as a whole.

Council of Europe 
Tom Van Grieken has been a member of the Council of Europe since 30 September 2019. Together with party senator Bob De Brabandere, he is a member of the political group European Conservatives Group and Democratic Alliance, which houses amongst others the British Conservative Party.

Political ideas 
Along with the VB's platform, Van Grieken supports independence for the Dutch-speaking Flemish region of Belgium. He argues that the Flemish and Walloon regions have too many political and cultural differences which paralyzes the Belgian state and holds Flanders back from greater success. He calls himself a Flemish patriot rather than a nationalist. He frequently states that patriotism is love and he compares the love for one's country to the love that a mother has for her child: "Patriotism is love. A mother loves her child and wants to protect it above all other children. That doesn't mean she hates the other children. A state is the same. It has a duty to first take care of its own citizens. You can only spend every euro once. Only if the needs of our own citizens are taken care of, we can consider helping others."

Support for Donald Trump 
Van Grieken supported Donald Trump for president. He saw the election of Donald Trump (and Brexit) as the start of "a patriotic wave that will roll over Europe". He publicly defended Trump multiple times and on many occasions accused the Flemish and European media of being biased against the United States president.

Publications 
On 3 May 2017 Tom Van Grieken published his first book titled Toekomst in eigen handen (translated: "The future in our own hands"). It was the first time in the history of the party that a book by a leading member was also for sale in regular bookshops. Even before publication, the book already caused a stir, due to the fact that professor of international politics Jonathan Holslag wrote the foreword. The general reception of the book was also a step in a new direction for the Vlaams Belang. Flemish journalist Walter Pauli wrote in the weekly news magazine Knack: "In their heyday, members of the Vlaams Belang party could only have dreamed of receiving the same reception as the new book by Vlaams Belang-chairman Tom Van Grieken." Het Laatste Nieuws, the biggest Flemish newspaper, read "surprising ideas" in it. Another newspaper, De Standaard, remarked: "The program remains radical, yet Van Grieken's use of language never goes out of line."

In 2020, Van Grieken published And Now It's Up To Us a biographical account of his leadership of VB to date and the journey he took of trying to rebuild the party and revive its support.

References 

1986 births
Living people
Belgian critics of Islam
Vlaams Belang politicians
Members of the Flemish Parliament
21st-century Belgian politicians